VUMC may refer to:

 Vanderbilt University Medical Center, in Nashville, Tennessee.
 VU University Medical Center, in Amsterdam, The Netherlands.